Endless Ocean (known as Forever Blue in Japan) is a scuba diving adventure game for the Wii. It is published by Nintendo and was developed by Arika, who also worked on their spiritual predecessor Everblue, another scuba diving adventure game. It was released in Japan on August 2, 2007, in Europe on November 9, 2007, and in North America on January 21, 2008 – after it had been planned for an October 2007 release.

A sequel entitled Endless Ocean 2: Adventures of the Deep was released in Japan on September 17, 2009, Europe on February 5, 2010, and North America on February 22, 2010, with the title Endless Ocean: Blue World.

Plot
Endless Ocean places the player in the role of a scuba diver exploring the Manaurai sea, a fictional setting in the South Pacific, in search of sea life and sunken treasure under the guidance of an assistant named Katherine Sunday.  In the sea, they will encounter a number of marine species ranging from smaller fish and penguins to massive whale sharks, manta rays and sperm whales. The range of marine wildlife in the game is extensive and includes many common and rare species. The player will also encounter dolphins and other cetaceans that can be trained to perform certain behaviours and become companions on dives. Species such as sharks are also present; however, they pose no threat to the player. The player also has access to a large aquarium that they can populate with species they have identified.  The sea's various locations provide a means for the player to experience general diving, cave diving, deep-water trench exploration, wreck diving, and other activities that might not otherwise be possible in a single real-world setting.

Late in the game, Katherine tells the player about how her father tried to look for a unique whale called the White Mother and never came back. The player and Katherine set out to find the White Mother, which entails seeking out the four types of whales present in the game (humpback whale, North Atlantic right whale, sperm whale, and blue whale) and placing motion sensors on different points of the map. Eventually one of the sensors is set off, and the player witnesses the White Mother, a large albino blue whale, as Katherine remembers her father.

Music

The song "Prayer" composed by Secret Garden and performed by Hayley Westenra is featured in the trailers for Endless Ocean and in the game itself. Westenra also contributes several other songs including her rendition of the Maori folk song "Pokarekare Ana". Players are also able to transfer their own MP3 music files to an SD card and listen to them while playing, providing a customizable soundtrack for the game. This is the second game on the Wii to provide such a feature, the first being Excite Truck.

Soundtrack
Embrace of Manaurai/Moon of Manaurai
Prayer
Pokarekare Ana
Oh Shenandoah
Amazing Grace
Hine e Hine	
E Pari Ra
Benedictus
River of Dreams
The Water is Wide

Reception

The game received "average" reviews according to the review aggregation website Metacritic. In Japan, Famitsu gave it a score of 10/10, 8/10, 9/10, and 8/10 for a total of 35 out of 40, praising the open-ended exploration aspect of the game, the scale of the play area and its soundtrack.

Endless Ocean had sold at least 50,000 copies in Japan.

Technical issues
On August 10, 2007, Nintendo issued a product recall in Japan after a major bug was found in copies of the game that has released eight days before. Nintendo re-released the game in Japan with the bug removed. The bug caused the screen to go blank and caused the console to freeze when the player put one or more bowmouth guitarfish into the aquarium. The exploration mode is not affected by this bug.

Sequel
A sequel entitled Endless Ocean 2: Adventures of the Deep was released in Japan (as Forever Blue: Call of the Ocean) on September 17, 2009, and in Europe on February 5, 2010.  The same sequel is called Endless Ocean: Blue World, which was released in North America on February 22, 2010.

See also
List of Wii games
Everblue
Everblue 2

Notes

References

External links
Endless Ocean at the European Touch! Generations website
 Official site
 Official site

2007 video games
Arika games
Nintendo games
Nintendo Wi-Fi Connection games
Scuba diving video games
Touch! Generations
Video games developed in Japan
Video games featuring protagonists of selectable gender
Video games with custom soundtrack support
Video games with underwater settings
Wii-only games
Wii Wi-Fi games
Multiplayer and single-player video games